This is a list of leaders of dependent territories. A dependent territory is a territory that does not possess full political independence or sovereignty as a sovereign state yet remains politically outside of the controlling state's integral area. This latter condition distinguishes a dependent territory from an autonomous region or administrative division, which forms an integral part of the 'parent' state.

The majority of the world's dependent territories are legacies of nineteenth and twentieth century colonial empires. This list divides the world's inhabited dependent territories roughly into half: those which are dependencies of Commonwealth nations, formerly members of the British Empire and all of which have King Charles III as head of state; and the remainder. Governors, managers or wardens of uninhabited dependent territories are excluded.

Current dependent territory leaders
Seven sovereign states possess one or more dependent territories: the United States, France, the United Kingdom, Australia, New Zealand, the Netherlands, and Norway.

Current leaders of autonomous or insular regions

Leaders of dependent Commonwealth territories

Leaders of dependent non-Commonwealth territories

See also
Administrative division
Colonial governors by year
List of leaders of dependent territories in 
List of current presidents of assembly
List of current governors of Afghanistan
List of current governors in Indonesia
List of Governors in Argentina
List of Brazil states governors
List of current Canadian lieutenant governors and commissioners
List of Ghanaian regional ministers
List of current Indian governors, List of current Indian lieutenant governors and administrators & List of current Indian chief ministers
List of governors of Japan
List of leaders of Malaysian states
List of Mexican state governors
List of Nigerian state governors
List of Governors of Pakistan & List of Chief Ministers in Pakistan
List of Palau states governors
List of current Philippine provincial governors
List of heads of federal subjects of Russia
List of Spanish regional legislatures & governments
List of state leaders by year
List of Sudan states governors
List of current United States governors

References

External links
Rulers.org
Worldstatesmen.org/

Dependent territories, leaders